Louis-Bonaventure Caron (November 16, 1828 – May 28, 1915) was a lawyer, judge and political figure in Quebec. He represented L'Islet in the Legislative Assembly of the Province of Canada from 1863 to 1866.

He was born in L'Islet, Quebec, the son of Bonaventure Caron and Rosalie Martineau, and was educated at the Sainte-Anne-de-la-Pocatière College, the Séminaire de Nicolet and the Séminaire de Saint-Hyacinthe. Caron was admitted to the bar in 1855. Caron was elected in L'Islet in 1858 but his election was overturned in June that same year; he ran unsuccessfully in 1861. He opposed Confederation. Caron was an unsuccessful candidate for a seat in the Canadian House of Commons in 1867 and 1869. In 1866, he married Angélique-Élisabeth-Hermine Pacaud, the daughter of Édouard-Louis Pacaud. In 1874, he was named to the Quebec Superior Court for the Gaspé district and then to the Quebec district three years later. He retired from the bench in 1903. Caron died in L'Islet at the age of 86.

Electoral record 

By-election: On Mr. Pouliot being unseated on petition

References 

1828 births
1915 deaths
Candidates in the 1867 Canadian federal election
Judges in Quebec
Members of the Legislative Assembly of the Province of Canada from Canada East
People from Chaudière-Appalaches